F97 or F-97 may refer to :
 F-97 (Michigan county highway)
 F-97 Starfire, a F-94 Starfire aircraft variant
 HMS Russell (F97), a British Royal Navy Blackwood class second-rate anti-submarine frigate